Sabih Arca (1901 – 24 April 1979) was a Turkish footballer who played for Fenerbahçe, where he scored 64 goals in 215 matches. He was born in İstanbul. He played as a central midfielder or as a left midfielder. He played for Fenerbahçe between 1918–29 and won the 1920–21, 1922-23 Istanbul Football League. He was a member of the General Harington Cup squad.

He was included in the first squad Turkey national football team that played against Romania on 26 October 1923. He scored 3 goals in 9 matches for the national team. On the squads he was included he did not make any appearances at the 1924 Summer Olympics and the 1928 Summer Olympics.

References

1901 births
1979 deaths
Footballers from Istanbul
Turkish footballers
Turkey international footballers
Fenerbahçe S.K. footballers
Association football midfielders
Olympic footballers of Turkey
Footballers at the 1924 Summer Olympics
Footballers at the 1928 Summer Olympics